ZeniMax Media Inc. is an American video game holding company based in Rockville, Maryland, and founded in 1999. 

The company owns publisher Bethesda Softworks with its development unit Bethesda Game Studios (developer of The Elder Scrolls, Fallout, and Starfield), as well as developers id Software (Doom, Quake, and Rage series), Arkane Studios (Dishonored, Prey, and Redfall), MachineGames (Wolfenstein series), Tango Gameworks (The Evil Within, Ghostwire: Tokyo, and Hi-Fi Rush), and ZeniMax Online Studios (The Elder Scrolls Online). 

ZeniMax Media was acquired by Microsoft in March 2021 and became part of Xbox Game Studios.

History

1999–2007: Early history, SBS investment, Providence investment 
ZeniMax was founded in 1999 by Bethesda Softworks founder Christopher Weaver and Robert A. Altman. The name is a portmanteau of "zenith" and "maximum". It was established as a successor to Media Technology Limited, Bethesda's parent company at the time.

Weaver brought Altman on board as CEO, contributing his stock in Bethesda Softworks so that the new shell company, named ZeniMax Media, would be able to obtain funding. Weaver served initially as chief technology officer of the company from 1999 to 2002, then moved to a non-operational role in 2002. Weaver filed a lawsuit against ZeniMax in 2002 for breach of contract, claiming he was owed US$1.2 million in severance pay.

In 2000, SBS Broadcasting acquired a 12.5% stake as part of the partnership between the two companies. Its chairman and CEO, Harry Sloan, became a ZeniMax board member a year prior to that. Sloan is a founding investor and board member of the company. Other original board members included Les Moonves as well as the now-deceased Robert Trump. The year 2000 also saw Terry McAuliffe, George Mitchell, Dean Devlin and Jon Feltheimer join ZeniMax as company advisors.

In 2004, ZeniMax acquired the Fallout franchise from Interplay Entertainment. Bethesda's Todd Howard said in January 2007 that "We started work on Fallout 3 in late 2004 with a few people. We only had about 10 people on it until Oblivion wrapped (...)". Fallout 3 was released in October 2008.

On August 1, 2007, ZeniMax announced the creation of ZeniMax Online Studios, a division headed by Matt Firor. In 2012, the company announced that it was developing The Elder Scrolls Online, ultimately releasing it on April 4, 2014.

On October 30, 2007, ZeniMax announced that the European broadcasting group ProSiebenSat.1 Media was intensifying its relationship with ZeniMax. It launched SevenGames.com, the international version of its German game platform, in December and work with ZeniMax to develop online games. ProSiebenSat.1 Media held a 9% stake in ZeniMax at the time through SBS Broadcasting, which it acquired the same year. SBS Broadcasting previously acquired a 12.5% stake in ZeniMax in October 2000 as part of the partnership between the two companies at the time. This included ZeniMax's e-Nexus Studios subsidiary, developing European entertainment portals and web sites for SBS, as well as other stock purchase agreements between SBS and ZeniMax.

As of 2007, Weaver held a 33% stake in the company. In 2007, it was valued at $1.2 billion, when it raised $300 million from Providence Equity Partners in exchange for a 25% stake. As of 2020, Weaver owned 'a pittance of the stock'.

2007–2017: Expansion and Oculus lawsuit 

By October 2007, ZeniMax employee count rose to 200 employees.

In September 2009, ZeniMax acquired rights to the Prey video game franchise. In December 2009, ZeniMax acquired publishing rights to the id Software game Rage from Electronic Arts.

In 2010, Providence invested another $150 million for an undisclosed stake. In May 2016, it was valued at $2.5 billion.

By January 2011, ZeniMax employed 400 people in its Rockville headquarters.

On March 3, 2011, ZeniMax announced a partnership with the University of Southern California School of Cinematic Arts to support its Interactive Media Division with a comprehensive educational program of guest lectures and internships.

In May 2014, ZeniMax sent a letter to Facebook and Oculus VR asserting that any contributions that John Carmack made to the Oculus Rift project are the intellectual property of ZeniMax, stating that "ZeniMax provided necessary VR technology and other valuable assistance to Palmer Luckey and other Oculus employees in 2012 and 2013 to make the Oculus Rift a viable VR product, superior to other VR market offerings."

On May 21, 2014, ZeniMax filed a lawsuit against Oculus. On June 25, 2014, Oculus filed an official response to the lawsuit. Oculus claimed ZeniMax was falsely claiming ownership to take advantage of the acquisition by Facebook. Oculus also claimed that the Oculus Rift did not share a single line of code or any technology with ZeniMax's code and technology.

In August 2016, ProSiebenSat.1 Media sold its stake in ZeniMax for 30 million euros.

On February 1, 2017, a Dallas, Texas jury awarded ZeniMax $500 million in their lawsuit against Oculus. The jury found that Oculus did not misappropriate ZeniMax trade secrets, but had violated ZeniMax's copyrights and trademarks in addition to violating a non-disclosure agreement.

2020–present: Microsoft subsidiary 

On September 21, 2020, Microsoft announced they entered into an agreement to acquire ZeniMax Media and all its subsidiaries for $7.5 billion. The deal promised to return more than six times Providence Equity's investment in the company. Altman considered selling ZeniMax for several years and at one point was close to a deal with rival Electronic Arts. Altman died on February 3, 2021, aged 73 at a hospital in Baltimore. By February 2021, Microsoft had created a subsidiary known as Vault that would be merged into ZeniMax as part of the acquisition.

A notice of effectiveness in regard to Microsoft's takeover was filed with the U.S. Securities and Exchange Commission on March 5, followed by the EU antitrust regulator's green light on March 8. Providence Equity, which had previously owned 25% of ZeniMax's shares, sold its shares around this time. A preliminary injunction to block the acquisition was being sought in a class-action lawsuit that ZeniMax faced over Fallout 4, with the plaintiffs in the case arguing that Microsoft could shield ZeniMax's assets from damages should they be found liable after the acquisition. Microsoft announced that the acquisition was complete on March 9 and that ZeniMax had become part of the Xbox Game Studios group. The total price of the deal was $8.1 billion. As a result of the acquisition, future games from ZeniMax and its studios will be exclusive to platforms supported by Xbox Game Pass, although Microsoft will allow studios to complete all contractual obligations to releases on other platforms. The ZeniMax Board of Directors was dissolved following the Microsoft purchase.

Subsidiaries 
 Alpha Dog Games in Halifax, Nova Scotia, Canada; founded in 2012, acquired in October 2019.
 Arkane Studios in Lyon, France; acquired in August 2010.
 Arkane Studios Austin in Austin, Texas, US; acquired in August 2010.
 Bethesda Softworks in Rockville, Maryland, US; acquired in 1999.
 Bethesda Game Studios in Rockville, Maryland, US; established in 2001.
 Bethesda Game Studios Austin in Austin, Texas, US; founded in October 2012 as BattleCry Studios, re-branded in March 2018.
 Bethesda Game Studios Dallas in Dallas, Texas, US; founded in 2007 as Escalation Studios, acquired in February 2017, re-branded in August 2018.
 Bethesda Game Studios Montreal in Montreal, Canada; established in December 2015.
 id Software in Richardson, Texas, US; acquired in June 2009.
 id Software Frankfurt in Frankfurt, Germany; founded in 2015.
 MachineGames in Uppsala, Sweden; acquired in November 2010.
 Roundhouse Studios in Madison, Wisconsin, US; founded in November 2019.
 Tango Gameworks in Tokyo, Japan; acquired in October 2010.
 ZeniMax Online Studios in Hunt Valley, Maryland, US; founded in 2007.

Defunct 
 e-Nexus Studios (later renamed ZeniMax Productions) in Los Angeles, California; founded in August 1999, headed by former The Simpsons co-creator Sam Simon.
 Mediatech West in Olympia, Washington; founded by Brent Erickson in Utah in 1992 as Flashpoint Productions and sold to Media Technology/Bethesda Softworks in 1995. Also referred to as Bethesda West.
 Mud Duck Productions; founded in 2002, closed in 2007.
 Vir2L Studios in Washington, D.C.; acquired in 1999, closed in 2010.
 XL Translab in Washington, D.C.; acquired in 1997 by and moved to Bethesda Softworks.
 Visionary Design Technologies

References

External links 
 

 
1999 establishments in Maryland
2021 mergers and acquisitions
American companies established in 1999
Companies based in Rockville, Maryland
Holding companies established in 1999
Holding companies of the United States
Microsoft acquisitions
Microsoft subsidiaries
Video game companies based in Maryland
Video game companies established in 1999
Video game development companies
Video game publishers
Xbox Game Studios